Caymus (also, Caymas) is a former settlement in Napa County, California. It lay at an elevation of 105 feet (32 m).

It was located on Rancho Caymus, a Mexican land grant, a very notable wine-producing area.

References

Former settlements in Napa County, California
Former populated places in California